The Women's 30 kilometre freestyle cross-country skiing competition at the 2006 Winter Olympics in Turin, Italy, was held on 24 February, at Pragelato.

Marit Bjørgen was the defending World Champion, while the last 30 kilometre free style (with individual start) in the World Cup was won by Yuliya Chepalova on 28 February 2004. The event had never been held as a mass start at the Olympics, but the last 30 km (a classical individual start event) was won by Gabriella Paruzzi of Italy.

Veteran Kateřina Neumannová won her second medal at the Torino Olympics. Her daughter, Luci, greeted the exhausted Neumannová after she won. Newcomer Justyna Kowalczyk won the first ever Olympic medal in cross-country skiing for Poland, for either men or women.

Results
The race was a 'mass start', with all 62 skiers starting at the same time. 11 skiers failed to finish the race.

References

Women's cross-country skiing at the 2006 Winter Olympics
Women's 30 kilometre cross-country skiing at the Winter Olympics